St Bride's Roman Catholic Church is located in East Kilbride in Scotland. It was designed by the architects Gillespie, Kidd and Coia and built between 1957 and 1964.

Church building
Located near the town centre, St Bride's is one of the most recognised buildings in East Kilbride. It was built shortly after the new town of East Kilbride was begun after World War II. The congregation formerly met in St. Bride's Guild Hall in The Village district of East Kilbride. "Kilbride" itself means "Church of Bride" in Scottish Gaelic (the translation has been modernised), and the parishes or monasteries in what was once a village before the reformation were named for St. Bride of Ireland.

The building of St Bride's Church is regarded as one of the finest examples of British twentieth-century ecclesiastical architecture. The church has many unusual features within its architectural structure from the "light cannons" which illuminate the sanctuary, to its externally imposing brick mass. The church is a Category A listed building.

In 2016 restoration work was carried out.

Clergy
Parish Priest Fr Frances McGachey

See also
DoCoMoMo Key Scottish Monuments
List of Category A listed buildings in South Lanarkshire
List of listed buildings in East Kilbride, South Lanarkshire
List of post-war Category A listed buildings in Scotland
Prospect 100 best modern Scottish buildings

References

External links

 St Bride's East Kilbride

Roman Catholic churches in Scotland
Churches in South Lanarkshire
Listed churches in Scotland
Category A listed buildings in South Lanarkshire
Buildings and structures completed in 1964
Buildings and structures in East Kilbride
1964 establishments in Scotland